The Greater Inclination was the earliest collection of short fiction by Edith Wharton. Published by Charles Scribner's Sons on 25 March 1899, the first printing of 1,250 sold out by June 1899. The collection consisted of eight works: seven short stories, and one short play in two acts.

The Stories 

 "The Muse's Tragedy" (Scribner's Magazine, January 1899)
 "A Journey"
 "The Pelican"
 "Souls Belated"
 "A Coward"
 "The Twilight of the God"
 "A Cup of Cold Water"
 "The Portrait"

References

External links
 
 The Edith Wharton Society
 

Short stories by Edith Wharton
1899 short story collections